The W9 was an American nuclear artillery shell fired from a special  howitzer. It was produced starting in 1952 and all were retired by 1957, being superseded by the W19.

Description

The W9 units which were retired in 1957 were recycled into lower yield T-4 Atomic Demolition Munitions. These were the first (semi) man-portable nuclear weapons.

Tests

The W9 is only the second gun-type nuclear weapon known to have been detonated; the first was the Little Boy nuclear weapon used in World War II.

The W9 artillery shell was test fired once, fired from the "Atomic Annie" M65 Atomic Cannon, in Upshot-Knothole Grable on May 25, 1953 at the NTS. Yield was the expected 15 kilotons.

Subsequently, the W33 nuclear artillery shell was test fired twice (not in a gun) during its development (shots Nougat/Aardvark and Plumbbob/Laplace). These four detonations are the only identified gun-type bomb detonations.

See also

 Nuclear artillery
 List of nuclear weapons

External links

 Allbombs.html list of all US nuclear weapons models at nuclearweaponarchive.org

W09
W09
Nuclear artillery
Military equipment introduced in the 1950s